{{Infobox election
| election_name = 2013 Essex County Council election
| country = Essex
| type = Parliamentary
| ongoing = no
| party_colour = yes
| previous_election = 2009 Essex County Council election
| previous_year = 2009
| next_election = 2017 Essex County Council election
| next_year = 2017
| seats_for_election = All 75 seats to Essex County Council
| majority_seats = 38
| election_date = 2 May 2013

| image1 = 
| leader1 = 
| party1 = Conservative Party (UK)
| leader_since1  = 
| leaders_seat1 = 
| last_election1 = 60 seats, 43.3%
| seats_before1 = 58
| seats1 = 42
| seat_change1 = 18
| popular_vote1 = 112,229
| percentage1 = 34.2%
| swing1 = 8.9%

| image2 = 
| leader2 = 
| party2 = UK Independence Party
| leader_since2 = 
| leaders_seat2 = 
| last_election2 = 0 seats, 4.6%
| seats_before2 = 1
| seats2 = 9
| seat_change2 = 9
| popular_vote2 = 90,812
| percentage2 = 27.7%
| swing2 = 23.1%

| image3 =
| leader3 = 
| party3 = Labour Party (UK)
| leader_since3 = 
| leaders_seat3 = 
| last_election3 = 1 seat, 10.8%
| seats_before3 = 2
| seats3 = 9
| seat_change3 = 8
| popular_vote3 = 57,250
| percentage3 = 17.4%
| swing3 = 6.7%

| image4 =
| leader4 = 
| party4 = Liberal Democrats (UK)
| leader_since4 = 
| leaders_seat4 = 
| last_election4 = 12 seats, 20.1%
| seats_before4 = 11
| seats4 = 9
| seat_change4 = 3
| popular_vote4 = 35,680
| percentage4 = 10.9%
| swing4 = 9.2%

| image5 = 
| leader5 =
| party5 = Green Party of England and Wales
| leader_since5 = 
| leaders_seat5 = 
| last_election5 = 0 seats, 6.8%
| seats_before5 = 0
| seats5 = 2
| seat_change5 = 2
| popular_vote5 = 15,187
| percentage5 = 4.6%
| swing5 = 2.2%

| image6 = 
| leader6 = 
| party6 = Tendring First
| leader_since6 = 
| leaders_seat6 = 
| last_election6 = 0 seats, 1.5%
| seats_before6 = 0
| seats6 = 1
| seat_change6 = 1
| popular_vote6 = 5,866
| percentage6 = 1.2%
| swing6 = 0.3%

| image7 = 
| leader7 = 
| party7 = Loughton Residents Association
| leader_since7 = 
| leaders_seat7 = 
| last_election7 = 1 seat, 0.7%
| seats_before7   = 1
| seats7 = 1
| seat_change7 =  
| popular_vote7 = 3,286
| percentage7 = 1.0%
| swing7 = 0.3%

| image8 = 
| leader8 = 
| party8 = Canvey Island Independent Party
| leader_since8 = 
| leaders_seat8 = 
| last_election8 = 1 seat, 0.4%
| seats_before8 = 0
| seats8 = 1
| seat_change8 = 
| popular_vote8 = 2,777
| percentage8 = 0.8%
| swing8 = 0.4%

| map_image = Essex UK local election 2013 map.svg
| map_size = 300px
| map_caption = Map showing the results of the 2013 Essex County Council elections.
| title = Majority party
| posttitle = Majority party after election
| before_election = Conservative
| before_party = 
| after_election = Conservative
| after_party = 
}}

An election to Essex County Council took place on 2 May 2013 as part of the 2013 United Kingdom local elections. 75 councillors were elected from 70 electoral divisions, which returned either one or two county councillors each by first-past-the-post voting for a four-year term of office. The electoral divisions were the same as those used at the previous election in 2009. No elections were held in Thurrock or Southend-on-Sea, which are unitary authorities outside the area covered by the County Council.

All locally registered electors (British, Irish, Commonwealth and European Union citizens) who were aged 18 or over on Thursday 2 May 2013 were entitled to vote in the local elections. Those who were temporarily away from their ordinary address (for example, away working, on holiday, in student accommodation or in hospital) were also entitled to vote in the local elections, although those who had moved abroad and registered as overseas electors cannot vote in the local elections. It is possible to register to vote at more than one address (such as a university student who had a term-time address and lives at home during holidays) at the discretion of the local Electoral Register Office, but it remains an offence to vote more than once in the same local government election.

Previous composition
2009 election

Composition of council seats before election

Changes between elections

In between the 2009 election and the 2013 election, the following council seats changed hands:

Summary
The election saw the Conservative Party retain overall control of the council, but their majority fell from twenty-two to four councillors. UKIP, Labour and the Liberal Democrats all won nine seats. Of the three second-placed parties who won nine seats, UKIP gained the largest share of the county-wide vote, more than 10% ahead of the Labour party. The Liberal Democrats remain as the official Opposition (entitling them to certain expenses and rights to additional speeches) due to incumbency, despite winning fewer votes. The Green Party gained two seats on the council, despite its overall share of the vote falling. The Independent Loughton Residents Association and the Canvey Island Independent Party both returned one member and an Independent candidate was also elected.

Results Summary

|-bgcolor=#F6F6F6
| colspan=2 style="text-align: right; margin-right: 1em" | Total| style="text-align: right;" | 75| colspan=5 |
| style="text-align: right;" | 328,435| style="text-align: right;" | 
|-

Election of Group Leaders

David Finch (Hedingham) was elected leader of the Conservative Group, with Kevin Bentley (Stanway and Pyefleet) as his deputy.

Michael Mackrory (Springfield) was re elected leader of the Liberal Democratic Group, with Theresa Higgins (Parsons Heath and East Gates) as his deputy.

Julie Young (Wivenhoe St. Andrew) was re elected leader of the Labour Group, with Ivan Henderson (Harwich) as her deputy.

Roger Lord (Brightlingsea) was elected leader of the UKIP group, with Jamie Huntman (Thundersley) as his deputy.

James Abbott (Witham Northern) was elected leader of the Green group, with Michael Hoy (Rochford West) as his deputy.

Chris Pond (Loughton Central) was elected leader of the Non-Aligned Group with John Lodge (Saffron Walden) as his deputy.

Mid term changes

On 3 September 2014 Lord resigned both as UKIP group leader and from the council after being replaced as that party's candidate for Clacton by Tory defector Douglas Carswell, Huntman succeeded him. Nigel Le Gresley (Wickford Crouch) would in turn replace Huntman, with Andrew Erskine (Tendring Rural East) as his deputy before he resigned from the party in March 2016 with Huntman again replacing him.

In mid 2016 deputy Labour leader Ivan Henderson (Harwich) replaced Young as leader with Michael Danvers (Harlow North) as his deputy.

Election of Leader of the Council

David Finch the leader of the conservative group was duly elected leader of the council and formed a conservative administration.

Results by District

BasildonDistrict SummaryDivision ResultsBraintreeDistrict SummaryDivision ResultsBrentwoodDistrict SummaryDivision ResultsCastle PointDistrict SummaryDivision ResultsChelmsfordDistrict SummaryDivision ResultsColchesterDistrict SummaryDivision ResultsEpping ForestDistrict SummaryDivision ResultsHarlowDistrict SummaryDivision ResultsMaldonDistrict SummaryDivision ResultsRochfordDistrict SummaryDivision ResultsTendringDistrict SummaryDivision ResultsUttlesfordDistrict SummaryDivision ResultsBy-elections
Summary

ResultsBrightlingseaBockingLaindon Park and FryernsClacton East'''

Notes

References

External links 
Results by election ward 2013

Essex County Council elections
2013 English local elections
2010s in Essex